2C-T-16 is a lesser-known psychedelic drug. It was originally named by Alexander Shulgin as described in his book PiHKAL (Phenethylamines i Have Known And Loved), however while Shulgin began synthesis of this compound he only got as far as the nitrostyrene intermediate, and did not complete the final synthetic step. Synthesis of 2C-T-16 was finally achieved by Daniel Trachsel some years later, and it was subsequently reported as showing similar psychedelic activity to related compounds, with a dose range of 10–25 mg and a duration of 4–6 hours, making it around the same potency as the better-known saturated analogue 2C-T-7, but with a significantly shorter duration of action. Binding studies in vitro showed 2C-T-16 to have a binding affinity of 44nM at 5-HT2A and 15nM at 5-HT2C. 2C-T-16 and related derivatives are potent partial agonists of the 5-HT1A, 5-HT2A, 5-HT2B and 5-HT2C receptors and induce a head-twitch response in mice.

Legality

Canada
As of October 31, 2016, 2C-T-16 is a controlled substance (Schedule III) in Canada.

See also 
 2C-AL
 2C-T-3
 2C-T-28
 3C-AL
 Phenethylamine
 Psychedelics, dissociatives and deliriants

References

External links 
 Aleph-2 Entry in PiHKAL, which mentions 2C-T-16

2C (psychedelics)
Entheogens
Thioethers
Allyl compounds